Cendol  is an iced sweet dessert that contains droplets of green rice flour jelly, coconut milk and palm sugar syrup. It is commonly found in Southeast Asia and is popular in Indonesia, Malaysia, Brunei, Cambodia, East Timor, Laos, Vietnam, Thailand, Singapore, and Myanmar. Next to the green jelly, additional toppings might be added, including diced jackfruit, sweetened red azuki beans, or durian.

Etymology

Earliest written records of the word cendol or tjendol (Dutch spelling) can be traced to dictionaries and books of the 19th century in the Dutch East Indies (now Indonesia). One of the oldest known records of the word tjendol is listed in the 1866 Oost-Indisch kookboek or East Indies recipe book. This book includes a cendol recipe with the title "Tjendol of Dawet" which indicates that cendol and dawet were already used synonymously at that time. In the dictionary Supplement op het Maleisch-Nederduitsch Woordenboek (1869) by Jan Pijnappel (Gz.), tjendol is described as a kind of drink or watery paste made from sago, coconut milk, sugar and salt.

In Malaya, the word "chendol" was first mentioned in 1932 as one of the foodstuffs available in Kuala Lumpur as recorded in the Malay Concordance Project that collects Malay writings.
There is a popular belief that the name "cendol" is related to, or originated from, the word jendol, in reference to the swollen green worm-like rice flour jelly; in Javanese, Sundanese, Indonesian, and Malay, jendol means "bump," "bulge," or "swollen." In most parts of Indonesia, cendol refer to the green rice flour jelly; while the concoction of that green rice flour jellies with coconut milk, shaved ice, areca palm sugar and sometimes diced jackfruit is called es cendol (in West Java) or dawet (in Central and East Java).

The Indonesian dictionary Kamus Besar describes cendol as a snack made from rice flour and other ingredients that are formed by filters, then mixed with palm sugar and coconut milk (for beverage). The Malay dictionary Kamus Dewan similarly defines it as a porridge-like drink with long strands made of rice flour in coconut milk and sugar syrup.

In Vietnam, this worm-like rice flour concoction is called bánh lọt or "secreted jellies". Bánh lọt is a common ingredient in a Vietnamese dessert drink called chè. In Thailand it is called lot chong which can be translated as "gone through a hole", indicating the way it is made by pressing the warm dough through a sieve into a container of cold water. In Cambodia, it is known as lot (លត /lɔːt/), bang-aem lot (បង្អែមលត /bɑŋʔaɛm lɔːt/), nom lot (នំលត /nɷm lɔːt/), and banh lot (បាញ់លត /baɲ lɔːt/).

History

The origin of cendol is not clear, and this sweet drink is widely spread across Southeast Asia. However, one suggestion is that cendol originated in Java, Indonesia as dawet.  The Javanese name of "dawet" was recorded in early 19th century Javanese manuscript of Serat Centhini, composed between 1814 and 1823 in Surakarta, Central Java. An Indonesian academic suggests that a dawet sweet drink may have been recorded in the Kresnayana manuscript, dated from Kediri Kingdom circa 12th century Java. In Java, dawet refer to the whole concoction of cendol green jellies, usually made from aren sagoo or rice flour, coconut milk and liquid gula jawa (palm sugar syrup). An Indonesian historian argues that sagoo or rice flour might have been used as sweet beverage ingredient in the rice agriculture society of ancient Java. Indeed, cendol jellies and its variations are rural agricultural product, still traditionally produced in Javanese villages. In Banjarnegara, Central Java, dawet is traditionally served without ice. Today, however additional ice cubes or shaved ice is commonly added into this dessert drink.

Cendol, however, has developed differently in different countries.  In Indonesia, cendol only refers to the green "pandan jelly served in coconut milk", where sometimes pandanus leaves or pieces of jackfruit may be added. This is different to the cendol in Malaysia and Singapore where various ingredients such as sweetened red beans and sweet corn may be mixed in like an es campur.

Cendol is typically served with ice, and this may have developed when ice became readily available. It may have originated in Malayan port cities such as Malacca and Penang where British refrigerated ships' technology would provide the required ice.

In Javanese tradition, dawet or cendol is a part of traditional Javanese wedding ceremony. The dodol dawet (Javanese for "selling dawet") is performed during Midodareni ceremony, a day before the wedding. After the siraman bridal shower, the parents would sell dawet to the attending guests and relatives. The guest paid the dawet using terracotta coins that would be given to the bride as a symbol of family earnings. The symbolic meaning was as the parents' hope that the tomorrow wedding would be attended by a lot of guests, "as plenty as the cendol jellies that being sold." In Dutch East Indies Java, dawet street hawkers using pikulan (baskets carried with balancing rod) are commonly found in Javanese cities, as can be seen in the old photograph dated from circa 1935.

In Indonesia five traditions of cendol making has been recognised as the intangible cultural heritage by the Indonesian Ministry of Education and Culture. Three dawet (Javanese version of cendol) traditions has been recognised in 2010 and 2018, all registered under Yogyakarta province. They are dawet, dawet camcau, and dawet sambel. Es cendol was recognized in 2016 registered under West Java province, while cendol was recognized in 2020 registered under Riau Islands province. Cendol has been declared a Malaysian heritage food by the Malaysian Department of National Heritage.

Ingredients

The ingredients of cendol relies heavily on aren (sugar palm) and coconut plants. The dessert's original or basic ingredients are coconut milk, jelly noodles made from rice flour with green food colouring (usually derived from the pandan leaf), shaved ice, and palm sugar. The cendol in Indonesia is usually served in a tall glass, assembled with liquid gula jawa or palm sugar syrup in the bottom, followed by green jellies, poured with coconut milk, and topped with shaved ice.

The Singaporean and Malaysian versions usually have sweetened red beans added, and are served in a bowl instead of a glass. The palm sugar, often added as a dark syrup, is referred to as gula melaka.

In Sunda, Indonesia, cendol is a dark-green pulpy dish of rice (or sago) flour worms with coconut milk and syrup of areca sugar. In Javanese, cendol refers to the green jelly-like part of the beverage, while the combination of cendol, palm sugar and coconut milk is called dawet. Today, the green cendol jelly noodles are mainly made from rice flour, since rice is more readily available. However, in Java, a traditional cendol worm-like jelly noodles was made from sagu aren, or sago starch extracted from the trunk of sugar palm (Arenga pinnata).

In Indonesia, additional ingredients might include tapai (fermented sweet cassava), black grass jelly, and sweetened condensed milk. In Indonesia and Thailand, cendol usually served in tall glass, in Malaysia and Singapore however, they usually served in a bowl. To make cendol chewy and not hard, the mixture must contain sago flour and rice flour in the right composition.

In Myanmar, mont let saung has 2 primary forms, htannyet mont let saung (ထန်းလျက်မုန့်လက်ဆောင်း), which is served in a caramel-coloured jaggery syrup, and onno mont let saung (အုန်းနို့မုန့်လက်ဆောင်း), which is served with coconut milk. The snack is an iconic snack during Thingyan (Burmese New Year), where it is commonly served by satuditha donors to revellers. Thai lot chong is closer to the Javanese original, only consisting of green worm-like jellies, coconut milk, liquid palm sugar, and shaved ice.

Variants

In Indonesia, the most famous variant is Javanese es dawet ayu from Banjarnegara, Central Java. Another variant is a black cendol called es dawet ireng from Purworejo, Central Java. Ireng is Javanese word for "black". Instead of green pandan leaf, this black cendol acquired its colour from merang or the ash of burned rice stalk mixed with water.

Other than the basic ingredients of green jelly noodles, palm sugar syrup, and coconut milk, iced cendol might be served with additional toppings. Popular additional toppings in Indonesia include diced jackfruit, tapai (fermented sweet cassava), durian flesh, and chocolate condensed milk. In Malaysia, additional toppings such as red beans, glutinous rice, grass jelly, creamed corn, durian, glutinous rice tapai and even ice cream might also be included.

The influence of Singapore and the West has given rise to different variations of cendol, such as cendol with vanilla ice cream or topped with durian. Another recent variant in Indonesia is cendol latte, which is a mix between cendol and coffee latte.

Selling
Cendol has become a quintessential part of cuisine in Southeast Asia and is often sold by vendors at roadsides, hawker centres, and food courts. Cendol vendors are almost ubiquitous in Indonesian cities, especially Jakarta, Bandung, and Yogyakarta. Originally cendol or dawet in Java was served without ice, but after the introduction of refrigeration technology, the cold cendol with shaved ice (es serut) was available and widely popular.

In Indonesia and Malaysia, cendol is commonly sold on the roadside by vendors. It is even dessert fare in Singapore, found in dessert stalls, food centres, coffee shops, and food courts.

In popular culture
In colloquial Indonesian, the term "cendol" has become an online rating system originated from Indonesian internet forum KASKUS, which its user accounts rating system represented as green "cendol" for positive and red "bata" (brick) for negative. If an online items tweaks interest, a user punch in one or more green commas resembling a cendol.

In December 2018, cendol became embroiled in a controversy after CNN listed the Singapore version as one of the world's top 50 desserts, triggering a furious response from Malaysians.

See also

 Ais kacang
 Es campur
 Es doger
 Es teler
 Halo-halo
 Kakigōri
 List of desserts

References

External links

 Cendol mention in Malaysia writing 1932 – malay concordance project.

Frozen desserts
Indonesian desserts
Malaysian cuisine
Non-alcoholic drinks
Singaporean cuisine
Bruneian cuisine
Foods containing coconut
Malay words and phrases
Burmese cuisine
Thai desserts and snacks
Indonesian words and phrases
Street food in Indonesia
Burmese desserts and snacks
Vietnamese desserts
Cambodian desserts
Laotian desserts
East Timorese cuisine
Rice flour dishes